Wayman William Kerksieck (December 6, 1913 – March 11, 1970) was a pitcher in Major League Baseball. He played for the Philadelphia Phillies.

References

External links

1913 births
1970 deaths
Major League Baseball pitchers
Philadelphia Phillies players
Baseball players from Arkansas
Arkansas–Monticello Boll Weevils baseball players
People from Prairie County, Arkansas
People from Stuttgart, Arkansas